Buwelikada may refer to:

 Buwelikada (7°13'N 80°34'E), a village in Sri Lanka
 Buwelikada (7°17'N 80°39'E), a village in Sri Lanka